Lavrov, or Lavrova (feminine; Лавро́ва) is a Russian surname and may refer to:

Alexander Lavrov (1838–1904), Russian metallurgist
Andrey Lavrov (b. 1962), Soviet/Russian handball goalkeeper and the only three-times Olympic handball champion
Andrey Lavrov (statesman) (1886–1936), Soviet statesman
Georgy Lavrov (1896–1967), Soviet architect
Kirill Lavrov (1925–2007), Soviet actor and People's Artist of the USSR
Mikhail Lavrov (1799–1882), Russian rear-admiral and Arctic explorer
Nikolai Lavrov (1802–1840), Russian baritone opera-singer
Pyotr Lavrov (1823–1900), Russian theorist of narodism, philosopher, publicist, and sociologist
Pyotr Lavrov (academician) (1856–1929), Russian/Soviet philologist and academician
Sergey Lavrov (b. 1950), Foreign Minister of Russia since 2004
Svyatoslav Lavrov (1923–2004), Soviet scientist in the field of mechanics and applied mathematics
Viktor Lavrov (1925–1943), Soviet soldier and Hero of the Soviet Union
Vladimir Lavrov (1919–2011), Soviet ambassador
Yuri Sergeevich Lavrov (1905–1980), Soviet actor and People's Artist of the USSR

See also
 Lavrovo

Russian-language surnames